PokerFace (also known as Ant & Dec's PokerFace) is a British game show broadcast on ITV, where one person is guaranteed to win £1 million. The show was created by Ant & Dec, who also host it. As implied by the title, PokerFace, is based on the bluffing aspect of poker games. The contestants do not necessarily need to get the questions right in order to win, and can bluff their way through the game and pressure their opponents into folding in order to win.

The show was originally going to be called The Con Test, but the name was changed just weeks before the show began. However, the Australian version is called The Con Test. Series 1 of the show was aired nightly for seven consecutive days (the seventh show being the final), whilst series 2 saw the show moved to a Saturday prime-time slot, lasted for seven weeks.

Format

On each of the first six episodes within a series, six contestants compete for a prize of £50,000 and a place in the £1 million final seventh episode.

Each episode begins with "The Grilling," a segment recorded one day earlier, in which the contestants are brought together to introduce and talk about themselves. They may tell the truth or lie as they see fit, with on-screen prompts indicating honesty or deception for the home viewers' benefit, and clips of their reactions to one another's claims (recorded after the Grilling is complete) are interspersed throughout the segment. The contestants then enter the studio and sit in front of separate screens, each of which displays only that person's score.

The first round consists of eight multiple-choice questions with three answer options each. Contestants have three seconds to lock in their responses, starting after the question and choices have been read, and receive £500 per correct answer. On-screen prompts and a leaderboard are used to show the contestants' performance to the viewers, and at the end of the round, Ant & Dec ask each person how they think they did. As in the Grilling, contestants may tell the truth or bluff at their discretion. All six contestants then stand at a line of podiums, each of which holds a red button, and a slow countdown from 10 begins. The first contestant to push their button (if any) leaves the game or "folds" and keeps all of their winnings; however, if no one does so, the contestant with the lowest total is eliminated and forfeits their money. In the event of a tie for last place, the contestant who answered the round's questions in the slower total time is eliminated. In either case, the departing contestant is briefly interviewed and shown the leaderboard in private. This element would later be used on another game show, Awake, albeit with different rules.

Four more rounds are played in this fashion, each with five questions and a value that increases by £250 per round. After the fifth round, the last player still in the game has their winnings increased to £50,000.

The six winners return for the final, but must put their £50,000 prizes at risk. All question values are doubled (£1,000 in the first round, increasing by £500 per round thereafter). Any contestants who fold keep both their £50,000 and any money they have earned in the final, but eliminated last-place contestants forfeit all of their winnings. The last remaining player has their winnings increased to £1 million. During the final of the second series, the fifth-round countdown started from 15 rather than 10.

For contestants who did not win a game, the maximum potential winnings total was £26,500 in the preliminary episodes. For those who won a game but did not win the final, the maximum total was £53,000 in addition to the £50,000 already won in the preliminaries.

International versions

References

External links
Poker Face programme description @ Fremantlemedia (via Internet Archive)
The Con Test on Network Ten
Wang Pai Die Zhong Die
Wang Pai Die Zhong Die
Pokerfejs on TV4.
.
Doble Cara  on TV Azteca.
Pókerarc on RTL Klub.
Jogo Duplo on RTP 1 - Portugal.
O Jogador on Rede Record.
Vel′ký hráč on TV JOJ.
Website of Ant & Dec
.

Ant & Dec
2006 British television series debuts
2007 British television series endings
2000s British game shows
ITV game shows
Television series by Fremantle (company)
English-language television shows